Mallory is a hamlet in Oswego County, New York, United States. Mallory has a post office with ZIP code 13103.

References

Hamlets in Oswego County, New York
Hamlets in New York (state)